The 2007 Open 13 was a men's tennis tournament played on indoor hard courts in Marseille, France. The event was part of the ATP International Series category of the 2007 ATP Tour. It was the 15th edition of the tournament and was held from 12 February through 18 February 2007. Gilles Simon won the singles title.

Finals

Singles

 Gilles Simon defeated  Marcos Baghdatis, 6–4, 7–6(7–3)
 It was Simon's first title of the year and of his career

Doubles

 Arnaud Clément /  Michaël Llodra defeated  Mark Knowles /  Daniel Nestor, 7–5, 4–6, [10–8]

References

External links
Official website

 
Open 13
Open 13
Open 13